Marinus Corné de Koning (born 27 September 1989) is a Dutch adaptive rower who competes at international level events. He is a four time World champion and European champion in both single sculls and double sculls. He is the training partner of Annika van der Meer and Esther van der Loos. He and van der Loos narrowly missed winning a medal in the mixed double sculls.

De Koning was born with one leg shorter than the other.

References

External links

1989 births
Living people
Sportspeople from Goes
Paralympic rowers of the Netherlands
Rowers at the 2016 Summer Paralympics
Rowers at the 2020 Summer Paralympics
Medalists at the 2020 Summer Paralympics